Nogometni klub Krim, commonly referred to as NK Krim or simply Krim, is a Slovenian football club from Ljubljana, which currently competes only with youth selections. The club was founded in 1945. It was known as Jadran Ljubljana in 1949 and as Odred-Krim between 1961 and 1964. They have won the Ljubljana-Littoral League in 1957 and 1958, and were the runners-up of the Slovenian Republic Cup in 1962.

References

External links
Official website 

Association football clubs established in 1945
Football clubs in Slovenia
1945 establishments in Slovenia
Football clubs in Ljubljana